I Am Angela is a 2018 adult documentary film on the career of Angela White, released on December 24, 2018.

Summary 
I Am Angela is a look at the reigning AVN Award for Female Performer of the Year  Angela White, incorporating interviews, documentary sequences and hardcore sex. This documentary brings together four AVN Hall of Fame directors. Jonni Darkko's films Angela in a 3-on-1 scene with Mick Blue, Markus Dupree, and Steve Holmes, featuring double anal and triple penetration. Dana Vespoli directs and performs in an all-girl anal threesome with Angela and alt-porn Joanna Angel. In collaboration, Joey Silvera directs Angela's first TS scene with trans star Chanel Santini. Evil Angel founder and porn pioneer John Stagliano documents Angela's first experience with Rocco Siffredi.

Reception

Critical response 
The film received overall positive reviews from industry critics. XCritic writer J.W. Sharp said "Watching ‘I Am Angela’ you get the sense that here is a woman conquering the field of porn, all by herself in her own way. The third film in Evil Chris' docuseries paints a portrait of a woman who works tirelessly at her craft. A perfectionist who puts her fans first by delivering the very best she has and never settling for second best. I mean just look at the star power she has. I never thought in a million years I would ever see Joey Silvera on screen again..." One reviewer on AdultDVDEmpire.com said "...I've been on a few so far with Angela now these past few years and it's been some of the best adult entertainment I've seen captured." Another said "There are no limitations on what this woman can do! Amazing release!"

Awards and nominations

References

External links 

 

2018 films
Documentary films about pornography
2018 documentary films
2010s English-language films